May Warden (9 May 1891 – 5 October 1978) was an English actress and comedian.

Career
Although she acted in other films and TV shows, in Germany and Scandinavia she is best known for her role as Miss Sophie in the 1963 comedy sketch Dinner for One together with Freddie Frinton.

She had non-speaking roles in Stanley Kubrick's A Clockwork Orange and as an aged Sara Kingdom in the Doctor Who serial The Daleks' Master Plan. Her last major role was as Billy's outspoken grandmother in the TV series Billy Liar (1973).

Personal life and death
She married comedian Silvester Stuart in 1915. The marriage produced four children two sons and two daughters, two of whom also went on to act on the stage. Her husband died on 12 August 1973. She lived in London until her death in 1978.

References

External links

BBC website
May Warden at the British Film Institute
May Warden (Aveleyman)

1891 births
1978 deaths
English film actresses
English television actresses
Actresses from Leeds
20th-century English actresses